Mount Hardy is a mountain standing close east of Mount Oldfield in the northwest part of the Tula Mountains, in Enderby Land, Antarctica. It was plotted from air photos taken from Australian National Antarctic Research Expeditions aircraft in 1956 and was named by the Antarctic Names Committee of Australia for K. Hardy, a weather observer at Wilkes Station in 1959.

Further reading 
  EDWARD S. GREW, Sapphirine + quartz association from Archean rocks in Enderby Land, Antarctica, American Mineralogist, Volume 65, pages 821–836, 1980, PP 822 - 823
  EDWARD S. GREW, Osumilite in the sapphirin quartz terrane of Enderby Land, Antarctica: implications for osumilite petrogenesis in the granulite facie, American Mineralogist, Volume 67, pages 762–787, 1982, PP 763 - 765
 R. L. Oliver, P. R. James, J. B. Jago, Antarctic Earth Science, P 42

References 

Mountains of Enderby Land